Ivanbegovina is a village in the Split-Dalmatia County, in Croatia. It is part of Podbablje municipality.

References

Populated places in Split-Dalmatia County